The works by Andrew Marvell consist of lyric poems, Latin poems, and many others.

Poetry
Poems of disputed authorship are marked with asterisks. Organization is based on the 1993 Everyman's Library edition.

Lyric poems
A Dialogue Between the Resolvèd Soul and Created Pleasure
On a Drop of Dew
The Coronet
Eyes and Tears
Bermudas
Clorinda and Damon
Two Songs at the Marriage of the Lord Fauconberg and the Lady Mary Cromwell
A Dialogue Between the Soul and Body
The Nymph Complaining for the Death of Her Fawn
Young Love
To His Coy Mistress
The Unfortunate Lover
The Gallery
The Fair Singer
Mourning
Daphnis and Chloe
The Definition of Love
The Picture of Little T.C. in a Prospect of Flowers
The Match
The Mower Against Gardens
Damon the Mower
The Mower to the Glo-Worms
The Mower's Song
Ametas and Thestylis Making Hay-Ropes
Musicks Empire
The Garden
The Second Chorus from Seneca's Tragedy, Thyestes

The Cromwell era
An Horatian Ode upon Cromwell's Return from Ireland
Upon the Hill and Grove at Bill-borow
Upon Appleton House
The Character of Holland
The First Anniversary of the Government Under His Highness The Lord Protector
A Poem upon the Death of His late Highnesse the Lord Protector

The Charles II era
The Last Instructions to a Painter
Epigramme Upon Blood's attempt to steale the Crown

Poets and heroes
Fleckno, an English Priest at Rome
To his Noble Friend, Mr. Richard Lovelace, upon his Poems
To his worthy Friend Doctor Witty upon his Translation of the Popular Errors
On Mr. Milton's Paradise Lost

Poems in Latin
Ros
Magdala, lascivos sic quum dimisit Amantes
Hortus
Translation. The Garden
Epigramma in Duos montes Amosclivum Et Bilboreum
Dignissimo suo Amico Doctori Wittie. De Translatione Vulgi Errorum D. Primrosii.
In Legationem Domini Oliveri St. John ad Provincias Foederatas
A Letter to Doctor Ingelo
Translation.
In Effigiem Oliveri Cromwell
Translation. On the Portrait of Oliver Cromwell.
In eandem Reginae Sueciae Transmissam
Translation. On the same being sent to the Queen of Sweden.
Upon an Eunuch; a Poet
In the French translation of Lucan, by Monsieur De Brebeuf are these Verses
Inscribenda Luparae
To A Gentleman that only upon the sight of the Author's writing....

Disputed authorship
A Dialogue between Thyrsis and Dorinda*
Tom May's Death*
On the Victory obtained by Blake over the Spaniards*

References

External links

The works of Andrew Marvell via Luminarium

Marvell, Andrew
Bibliographies by writer